The 2001 Czech Republic motorcycle Grand Prix was the tenth round of the 2001 Grand Prix motorcycle racing season. It took place on the weekend of 24–26 August 2001 at the Masaryk Circuit.

500 cc classification

250 cc classification

125 cc classification

Championship standings after the race (500cc)

Below are the standings for the top five riders and constructors after round ten has concluded.

Riders' Championship standings

Constructors' Championship standings

 Note: Only the top five positions are included for both sets of standings.

References

Czech Republic motorcycle Grand Prix
Czech Republic
Motorcycle Grand Prix